The Brownsville Public Utilities Board, or Brownsville PUB, is the main utility company in the city of Brownsville, Texas.  It is the largest of three electric providers (in terms of local customers) in the city of Brownsville, as well as the largest water provider for the city.

Its electric division is currently the only city owned electric provider of any city in the Rio Grande Valley metropolitan area. It has operated since 1907 and currently owns three power plants and distributes power to approximately 1,300 miles of wires and 14 substations.

External links
 Brownsville Public Utilities Board

Brownsville, Texas
Municipal electric utilities of the United States
Water companies of the United States
Companies based in Texas